Kuvaev or Kuvayev and Kuvaeva or Kuvayeva (Кува́ева; feminine) is a Russian surname. Notable people with the surname include:

Andrey Kuvaev (born 1983), Russian Paralympic footballer
Leo Kuvayev (born 1972), Russian computer criminal
Oleg Kuvaev (born 1967), Russian-Israeli animator and the creator of Masyanya
Sergey Kuvaev (born 1984), Russian actor, model and videoblogger in Japan

Russian-language surnames